In telecommunications, data-transfer rate is the average number of bits (bitrate), characters or symbols (baudrate), or data blocks per unit time passing through a communication link in a data-transmission system. Common data rate units are multiples of bits per second (bit/s) and bytes per second (B/s). For example, the data rates of modern residential high-speed Internet connections are commonly expressed in megabits per second (Mbit/s).

Standards for unit symbols and prefixes

Unit symbol 
The ISQ symbols for the bit and byte are bit and B, respectively. In the context of data-rate units, one byte consists of 8 bits, and is synonymous with the unit octet. The abbreviation bps is often used to mean bit/s, so that when a 1 Mbps connection is advertised, it usually means that the maximum achievable bandwidth is 1 Mbit/s (one million bits per second), which is 0.125 MB/s (megabyte per second), or about 0.1192 MiB/s (mebibyte per second). The Institute of Electrical and Electronics Engineers (IEEE) uses the symbol b for bit.

Unit prefixes 
In both the SI and ISQ, the prefix k stands for kilo, meaning 1,000, while Ki is the symbol for the binary prefix kibi-, meaning 1,024. The binary prefixes were  introduced in 1998 by the International Electrotechnical Commission (IEC) and in IEEE 1541-2002 which was reaffirmed on 27 March 2008. The letter K is often used as a non-standard abbreviation for 1,024, especially in "KB" to mean KiB, the kilobyte in its binary sense.  In the context of data rates, however, typically only decimal prefixes are used, and they have their standard SI interpretation.

Variations 
In 1999, the IEC published Amendment 2 to "IEC 60027-2: Letter symbols to be used in electrical technology – Part 2: Telecommunications and electronics".  This standard, approved in 1998, introduced the prefixes kibi-, mebi-, gibi-, tebi-, pebi-, and exbi- to be used in specifying binary multiples of a quantity. The name is derived from the first two letters of the original SI prefixes followed by bi (short for binary). It also clarifies that the SI prefixes are used only to mean powers of 10 and never powers of 2.

Decimal multiples of bits 
These units are often used in a manner inconsistent with the IEC standard.

Kilobit per second 
Kilobit per second (symbol kbit/s or kb/s, often abbreviated "kbps") is a unit of data transfer rate equal to:
 1,000 bits per second
 125 bytes per second

Megabit per second 
Megabit per second (symbol Mbit/s or Mb/s, often abbreviated "Mbps") is a unit of data transfer rate equal to:
 1,000 kilobits per second
 1,000,000 bits per second
 125,000 bytes per second
 125 kilobytes per second

Gigabit per second 
Gigabit per second (symbol Gbit/s or Gb/s, often abbreviated "Gbps") is a unit of data transfer rate equal to:
 1,000 megabits per second
 1,000,000 kilobits per second
 1,000,000,000 bits per second
 125,000,000 bytes per second
 125 megabytes per second

Terabit per second 
Terabit per second (symbol Tbit/s or Tb/s, sometimes abbreviated "Tbps") is a unit of data transfer rate equal to:
 1,000 gigabits per second
 1,000,000 megabits per second
 1,000,000,000 kilobits per second
 1,000,000,000,000 bits per second
 125,000,000,000 bytes per second
 125 gigabytes per second

Decimal multiples of bytes 
These units are often not used in the suggested ways; see above section titled "variations".

Kilobyte per second 
kilobyte per second (kB/s) (can be abbreviated as kBps) is a unit of data transfer rate equal to:
 8,000 bits per second
 1,000 bytes per second
 8 kilobits per second

Megabyte per second 
megabyte per second (MB/s) (can be abbreviated as MBps) is a unit of data transfer rate equal to:
 8,000,000 bits per second
 1,000,000 bytes per second
 1,000 kilobytes per second
 8 megabits per second

Gigabyte per second 
gigabyte per second (GB/s) (can be abbreviated as GBps) is a unit of data transfer rate equal to:
 8,000,000,000 bits per second
 1,000,000,000 bytes per second
 1,000,000 kilobytes per second
 1,000 megabytes per second
 8 gigabits per second

Terabyte per second 
terabyte per second (TB/s) (can be abbreviated as TBps) is a unit of data transfer rate equal to:
 8,000,000,000,000 bits per second
 1,000,000,000,000 bytes per second
 1,000,000,000 kilobytes per second
 1,000,000 megabytes per second
 1,000 gigabytes per second
 8 terabits per second

Conversion table

Examples of bit rates

See also 
 Binary prefix
 Bit rate
 List of interface bit rates
 Orders of magnitude (bit rate)
 Orders of magnitude (data)
 Metric prefix
 Instructions per second

Notes

References 
 International Electrotechnical Commission (2007). "Prefixes for binary multiples" (archived). Retrieved on 2007-05-06. - updated page  lacks table but now references IEC 80000-13:2008 rather than IEC 60027-2.
 IEC 60027-2 "Letter symbols to be used in electrical technology – Part 2: Telecommunications and electronics+
 Donald Knuth: "What is a kilobyte?"

External links
 Valid8 Data Rate Calculator 

Data transmission
Units of flow
Units of information
Units of temporal rate